Haviland Routh (June 20, 1871 – January 1959) was a Canadian ice hockey player for the Montreal Hockey Club. He played at the rover position. Routh won two Stanley Cups in 1893 and 1894 with Montreal HC. He died in Montreal in January 1959 at the age of 87 and was survived by his daughter, Marguerite.

References

Notes

Montreal Hockey Club players
Stanley Cup champions
1871 births
1959 deaths
Canadian ice hockey players